José Sartor (5 April 1928 – 24 August 1982) was an Argentine boxer. He competed in the men's heavyweight event at the 1952 Summer Olympics.

References

1928 births
1982 deaths
Argentine male boxers
Olympic boxers of Argentina
Boxers at the 1952 Summer Olympics
Place of birth missing
Heavyweight boxers